Alternative Airplay is a record chart that ranks the most-played songs on American modern rock radio stations. Published by the music industry magazine Billboard, it was created in the midst of the growing popularity of alternative music on rock radio in the late 1980s. As less-established alternative acts were receiving minimal exposure on album-oriented rock (AOR) radio stations, their labels turned to modern rock stations for airplay. Billboard introduced the chart in response to demand within the music industry for consistent information on the commercial performance of alternative music. During the decade, it was known as the Modern Rock Tracks chart and tabulated based on weighted reports from twenty-nine radio stations: eighteen established standard-bearer commercial stations and eleven non-commercial college stations.

The Modern Rock Tracks chart debuted in the September 10, 1988, issue of Billboard, with the inaugural number-one song being "Peek-a-Boo" by the English band Siouxsie and the Banshees. Upon its debut, several publications noted the presence of more independent artists on Modern Rock Tracks compared to its companion chart, Album Rock Tracks. By the end of the decade, twenty-two songs had topped the chart. The American bands R.E.M. and The B-52's each scored two number-one songs on the Modern Rock Tracks chart during the 1980s, the most for any artist within the decade. The R.E.M. song "Orange Crush" spent the longest period atop the chart during the decade, staying at number one for eight consecutive weeks from November 1988 to January 1989. The final number one of the 1980s was "Blues from a Gun" by the Scottish band The Jesus and Mary Chain.

Number-one songs
Key
 – Billboard year-end number-one song
↑ – Return of a song to number one

References

Bibliography

External links
 Alternative Airplay at Billboard

1980s
United States modern rock